Marcos Aurélio Galeano, (born 28 March 1972 in Ivaiporã, Paraná), known as just Galeano, is a former Brazilian footballer at the positions of midfielder and defender. In April 2010, Galeano returned to Palmeiras, club where he spent most of his career, as a staff member.

Club statistics

Honours

Juventude
Brazilian Série B: 1994

Palmeiras
Euro-America Cup: 1996
São Paulo State Championship: 1996
Brazilian Cup: 1998
Mercosur Cup: 1998
Libertadores Cup: 1999
Rio-São Paulo Tournament: 2000
Brazilian Champions Cup: 2000

References

External links

TFF profile
Galeano's fotolog

1972 births
Living people
Brazilian footballers
Brazilian expatriate footballers
Brazilian expatriate sportspeople in Turkey
Expatriate footballers in Turkey
Association football midfielders
Association football defenders
Sociedade Esportiva Palmeiras players
Esporte Clube Juventude players
Botafogo de Futebol e Regatas players
Gamba Osaka players
MKE Ankaragücü footballers
Esporte Clube Bahia players
Figueirense FC players
Associação Atlética Ponte Preta players
Fortaleza Esporte Clube players
Goiás Esporte Clube players
Esporte Clube Santo André players
Joinville Esporte Clube players
Copa Libertadores-winning players
Expatriate footballers in Japan
Campeonato Brasileiro Série A players
J1 League players
Association football utility players
Sportspeople from Paraná (state)